Catherine de Heilbronn is a 1980 French TV film made by Éric Rohmer for the television channel Antenne 2. It is a record of Rohmer's stage production of the play Das Käthchen von Heilbronn by Heinrich von Kleist at the Théâtre des Amandiers in 1979. The cast includes Pascale Ogier, Arielle Dombasle, Marie Rivière, Jean-Marc Bory and Pascal Greggory.

Plot
In the Middle Ages, the earl Wetter von Strahl is accused of having bewitched  Catherine, the daughter of the gunsmith of Heilbronn; the earl tries to exonerate himself in the interrogation of the young woman.

Cast
 Pascale Ogier, as Catherine de Heilbronn
 Pascal Greggory, as Friedrich Wetter, comte Strahl
 Arielle Dombasle, as Kunigunde de Thurneck
 Jean-Marc Bory, as Theobald Friedeborn
 Marie Rivière as Brigitte

References

External links
 

1980 films
1980 television films
1980 drama films
1980s French-language films
Drama television films
Filmed stage productions
Films based on works by Heinrich von Kleist
Films directed by Éric Rohmer
Films set in the Holy Roman Empire
Films set in the Middle Ages
French drama films
French films based on plays
French television films
1980s French films